The Texas cichlid (Herichthys cyanoguttatus, formerly Cichlasoma cyanoguttatum)  is a freshwater fish of the cichlid family. This is the only cichlid species that is native to the United States.  The fish, also known as Rio Grande cichlid, originates from the lower Rio Grande drainage in Texas near Brownsville and Northeastern Mexico.

This cichlid is known for its cream and turquoise spots. Adult males also develop a nuchal hump on their head.

Classification
The Texas cichlid was originally part of the genus Cichlasoma until this group was restricted to South American cichlid species. The fish is now a part of Herichthys, which is defined as cichlids that "share a color pattern of short vertical bars and black spots posteriorly from the middle of the side, and a unique breeding color pattern in which the dorsal half of the entire head and anterior flank region turns a pale grayish color in contrast to black or dark gray adjacent areas, or the entire body turns pale."

Mating and parental habits

Mating pairs
The cichlid is known for its complex reproductive behavior with a long parental care period.  The mating habits of the cichlid are tied to the monogamous nature of the fish.  The competitive pairs always consist of a larger male and a smaller female. These pairs travel long distances between the months of March and August to mate and aggressively defend their mating sites against other pairs of cichlids.

Spawning sites
Prior to spawning, a site, generally consisting of rocks in water less than 30 cm deep, is chosen by both parents and cleaned by nipping the surface.  No individual cichlid appears to maintain territory prior to mating.  After a territory is selected and cleaned, the eggs are deposited.

Egg stage
Females release between 1-5 eggs at a time.   Males then go to the eggs and excrete a seminal fluid onto the egg.  This process is repeated until around 2000 eggs have been distributed. During the egg stage, both parents alternate in the parental tasks, though males spend more time patrolling territory and females spend more time actively attending to the offspring by fanning the eggs. At certain intervals, the female cichlid stops fanning the eggs and begins nipping at them.  The eggs then hatch into wrigglers with yolk sacks which are absorbed after one week and the wrigglers become free-swimming fry.

After hatching
The fry form a small group that slowly moves around the territory with the parents stationed in the middle.  Both parents defend this small territory against intruders.  At all stages, the female violently chases the intruders more often and faster than the male parent.  It is very rare that both cichlid parents either leave or remain with their young.  Typically, the roles are exchanged, but this exchange becomes less frequent during the fry stage as both parents tend to stay with the young.

Diet
The cichlid has an omnivorous diet that consists of vegetable matter or detritus, often feasting on plants, insects, and smaller fish as well as fish eggs. The cichlid, in certain situations, can also be described as an "opportunistic carnivore", feeding on small vertebrates and invertebrates, including small frogs and water snakes.  The cichlid is a "deliberate hunter" and it depends on the camouflage of its skin in order to sneak up on its prey.

As an invasive fish
The Texas cichlid has several qualities that contribute to its success as an invasive species. The cichlid is not affected by high-energy wave events and pollution from outfall canals. These cichlids also have very high tolerance for salt water and high salinities that would normally act as barriers to the entrance of invasive fish. The cichlid can disrupt the food web with their varied diet, which can shift depending on what fish are around it.  They are aggressive whether they are holding territory or not. This aggression can inhibit growth and reproduction of native species and the effects can be far-reaching. The cichlid also forces other fish into open areas, which lowers the population count of the other species through predation. The cichlid is a pioneer species that paves the way for other fish to invade, which has occurred in Six Mile Creek, Florida, and in the upper San Antonio River The actual effects of the cichlid on the environment are, at this point, unknown.

Florida
In Florida, the success of the fish has been limited to artificial canals.  It is unknown how the fish first got into Florida, but it is believed that the fish was introduced in Florida from Texas stocks in 1941 by a private individual.  Other theories are that fish farms were flooded and the result was that this fish escaped.

Louisiana
In Louisiana, the fish has slowly taken over the waters of New Orleans.  The fish has a high salinity tolerance (up to 8ppt), but it is likely that this is caused by the interbreeding of this fish and the Herichthys carpintis, which makes it an ideal invader for the brackish conditions of southern Louisiana.  It is believed that this fish has entered into the New Orleans area through multiple aquarium releases in central Jefferson Parish in 1989.  Since the fish has a short mating cycle, it did not take long for the fish to make its way through the canal system and into Lake Pontchartrain. Pump stations and Lake Pontchartrain aided to the spreading of the fish into other canals.

Herichthys cyanoguttatus has been present in natural and degraded habitats of the Greater New Orleans Metropolitan Area for at least 20 years. The first time it was ever recorded that the cichlid had been caught in New Orleans was on June 17, 1996.  In May 1998, 23 of these fish were caught in a Jefferson Parish canal. Between 2006 and 2007, the number of cichlids increased significantly in sites such as Pontchartrain Lagoon, Bayou Metairie, and Marconi Lagoon.

The effect of the invasive fish in the area is as of now, uncertain, but many studies have been done to figure out what exactly is going on.  Some of these studies have shown that this cichlid has spread into Bayou St. John and City Park. The cichlid acts aggressively toward native Largemouth bass, Western mosquitofish, sailfin mollies, and blue crabs.  This aggressiveness can occur in the form of tail beating and mouth wrestling.  The fish also appears to cause reproductive failure of sheepshead minnows. The cichlid was largely unaffected by abiotic events like Hurricanes Katrina and Rita because of its high tolerance for salt-water intake.  In fact, these hurricanes actually helped the fish to take over the bayous of New Orleans.  When the park flooded during Katrina, it helped the cichlid to spread.

In Bayou St. John, the cichlid threatens to overwhelm native species and ruin the efforts of the Louisiana Department of Wildlife and Fisheries to restore the historical fishery of Bayou St. John.  Because the fish competes with native fish for shallow mating sites, it reduces the chances of the diverse fishery ever being fully recovered. The fish has already eliminated several smaller fish in this bayou, including killifish and sheepshead minnows.  In fact, if the Louisiana Department of Wildlife and Fisheries did not routinely re-stock several midsized species, it is likely that the cichlid would have eliminated these fish too. Because of this, there is even a competition at the City Park Big Bass Fishing Rodeo & Fishtival to catch the most cichlids. According to a fisherman Joe Adams, who participates in the competition, "They will eat just about anything...I know one guy who catches them with French fries...pieces of a hot dog and pieces of canned corn." Despite these efforts, there is practically no chance of eradicating this fish from New Orleans' waters mainly because of its quick mating cycle.

As a sportfish and foodfish 
Texas cichlids have been deliberately and accidentally introduced into the wild throughout the subtropic southern United States from Texas to Florida (where water temperatures rarely dip below 48 degrees F), where they have flourished, and are often caught incidentally when fishing for sunfish and other panfish. Most anglers outside South and Central Texas do not recognize the fish and they are released, however these fish are considered invasives and should be destroyed if caught outside their natural range. They are regularly targeted in both South Texas, where they are known as "Rio Grande Cichlid" and Northern Mexico, where they are known as "Mojarra de Norte. In Lake Guerrero, which is recognized for its excellent largemouth bass fishing, the Texas cichlid is considered by locals to be the best eating fish in the lake. Their taste is similar to commercially raised tilapia, an African cichlid species to which they are distantly related. The fish is caught on light tackle with small hooks (#4 to #8) like that used for other panfish, with live crickets making excellent bait, however they will strike a wide variety of baits. They fight similarly to bluegill sunfish, making tight circles and then darting off in a broadsided run. Average size of adult fish in the wild is 5-6 inches, and 1 pounds, with 2 pounds not being uncommon.

As an aquarium fish 
The Texas cichlid is commonly found in the aquarium trade and became relatively popular in the 1980s with cichlid enthusiasts because of its iridescent blue and green markings.

The "green Texas cichlid" commonly seen in pet stores is another species, Herichthys carpintis, whose range does not extend into Texas. The common name comes from a physical similarity to the Texas cichlid. The "red Texas" cichlid is not a Texas cichlid (Herichthys cyanoguttatus) but an intergeneric hybrid of Herichthys and Amphilophus parents.

See also
List of freshwater aquarium fish species

References

Other sources
Goldstein, R. J. (2000), American Aquarium Fishes, p. 385-386, Texas A&M University Press, College Station, Texas. . 

Herichthys
Cichlid fish of North America
Freshwater fish of Mexico
Freshwater fish of the United States
Fauna of the Rio Grande valleys
Natural history of Tamaulipas
Natural history of Texas
Fish described in 1854
Taxa named by Spencer Fullerton Baird
Taxa named by Charles Frédéric Girard